Wally Dieng  (born 17 November 1973 in Paris, France) is a French retired footballer who played 8 matches in Ligue 1 for SM Caen in the period 1992–1994 and 13 matches in Ligue 2 for CS Sedan Ardennes in the 1994–1995 season.

References

External links

French footballers
Stade Malherbe Caen players
CS Sedan Ardennes players
Footballers from Paris
1973 births
Living people
Association football defenders